In journalism, local news refers to coverage of events, by the news, in a local context that would not be an interest of another locality, or otherwise be of national or international scope. Local news, in contrast to national or international news, caters to the news of their regional and local communities; they focus on more localized issues and events. Some key features of local newsrooms includes regional politics, weather, business, and human interest stories. Local news readership has been declining in recent years, according to a recent study. And as more and more television consumers tap into streamed programming, local news viewership is beginning to decline. Nikki Usher, an associate professor at the College of Media at the University of Illinois, argued in The Complicated Future of Local News that "critical and comprehensive local news is a recent invention, not a core element of the history of American democracy.”

Television 
Opt-outs of local television news are frequent before, during, or after national evening news television programming. Often, television networks can also commission or make provisions for their local stations to produce longer standalone local news programmes. In some cases, local television markets/viewing areas within a country may even have a dedicated 24-hour local news channel. Local news stations have also started covering less and less local politics in favor of stories that they believe will garner more clicks or attention. A study has also shown that there has also been less investigative journalism within local news stations in recent years.

Differences 
Local news largely covers the following:
 local sports
 local crime and justice
 local weather
 local business and economy
 local events
 local education
 local politics
 local traffic updates (especially during morning and evening newscasts)

National and international news, however, tend to cover a wider range of content, including news concerning specialized institutions of wide-ranging international power or influence, such as:
 (inter)national political and intergovernmental events
 stock markets
 (inter)national sports competitions
 regional environmental events
 media/entertainment events
 science/technology events
 air traffic/aviatory transport events
 defense/security events

Practices in each country 
In the United States, local news is provided on local commercial broadcasting channels (some of which are television network affiliates). They can either be standalone newscasts that run for at least a half-hour or short segments that air attached to national morning newscasts approximately 25 and 55 minutes past the hour. As not all stations are owned and operated by a television network, the graphics, branding, and studio designs of a station's newscasts often differ from the network they are affiliated with although in recent years, affiliates have made some form of on-air reference to their corresponding networks in the branding of their newscasts. In addition, the local news departments of stations also superimpose their on-screen digital clocks, thermometers, and (occasionally) local news tickers on graphics provided by networks during morning network newscasts. Some cable channels are dedicated to local news coverage. Examples of this include NY1 in New York and WJLA 24/7 News (formerly NewsChannel 8) in the Washington, D.C. market.

In Canada, the commercial broadcasters such as CTV have regional morning newscasts.  There is also a bloc in the late afternoon dedicated to regional news.

In the United Kingdom, most local news is provided on a local network station with similar branding and studio design to that of the national network news. Examples of this include the nationally networked BBC News and its regional news services such as BBC North West Tonight (on BBC North West) and BBC Newsline (on BBC Northern Ireland); the nationally networked ITV News and its regional stations including ITV Granada and UTV. The long version of BBC and ITV's local news shows often air during the 18:00 hour on weekday evenings. STV, which simulcasts most of the ITV network's programmes in Scotland, is not owned and operated by ITV but has its own branded newscast that broadcasts Scottish-centred news at the same time as ITV's regional news services.

In France, most local news is aired on France Television's France 3. Additionally BFM TV also has a local news channel for the Ile-de-France region called BFM Paris.

In Germany, each regional public broadcaster shows a half-hour's worth of regional news at 19:30 Central European Time on channel 3.

Norway's public broadcaster, NRK1, airs a local news programme called NRK Distriktsnyheter (name of viewing area) every weekday evening at 18:45 Central European Time, just before the main national newscast Dagsrevyen. A replay of all local newscasts across the country is shown on NRK2 the following morning (Tuesday to Saturday).

Finland's public broadcaster (YLE) airs an eight-minute-long regional news bulletin at 18:21 Eastern European Time every weeknight on YLE1. The bulletins from all regions are replayed across the country the following day starting from 10:50 to 12:10 Eastern European Time on YLE1.

In Sweden, SVT's regional news is simply called SVT Nyheter (name of viewing area) which shares the same branding as the network's main newscast, Rapport. Unlike SVT's counterparts in the US and UK, during morning programmes, the local news opt-out airs in the middle of each half-hour. Since June 2017, the morning regional cut-ins no longer feature an in-studio presenter but instead show compiled short reports from various correspondents across the region. When SVT World was still airing, the simulcast of the morning programme featured a different regional opt-out during each half-hour. A 13-minute standalone local newscast airs at 18:30 Central European Time each weekday evening after Sportnytt (SVT's sport news) on SVT1. Additionally, a short local news segment is incorporated into SVT's other evening newscast Aktuellt which airs on SVT2. In that case, this local news segment shares the same branding and graphics as Aktuellt. There are no local SVT newscasts on Saturdays.

Newspapers
A lot of newspapers specialise in covering the cities they are based in. Although paper copies of local newspapers are usually sold and circulated exclusively in the local areas they operate (with entities such as libraries or relatives wanting a copy of the paper where a family member is mentioned being mailed copies of outside of circulation areas), companies may make digital copies of their newspapers available to interested readers directly on their website or through services such as PressReader, often with a paid subscription.

In the United States, although newspapers such as The New York Times and The Washington Post have a 'national' focus on their front pages, they still have dedicated sections for news in the areas they are based in. Weather sections also highlight conditions in the local area and the sport sections feature local teams alongside national sport stories. Their local editions also feature local classified ads.

Local News in the digital age
In the age of digital media, local news readership has started to fall. This can be attributed to the younger generation's disinterest in traditional news sources and the inability of news stations to fully integrate their business models and practices into the age of digital journalism. While national and international news industries began using Twitter as a way to break news and interact with their audiences, local news mediums have fallen behind, trending towards using Twitter as a secondary source for spreading information rather than a primary tool for audience engagement.

Since Internet sites reach a larger audience, more local news agencies have started their own websites to compete in the digital age. Websites are a great way for local news stations to produce more interactive content, which engages the audiences and increases readership.

Aside from the Internet, Twitter specifically has become a great way to engage the younger generation in news, gain more readership, and spread information. National news sources have started using Twitter to quickly notify the public of breaking news and to interact with their readers, but local news have failed to integrate Twitter and other forms of social media into their journalism practices as successfully. While local TV news stations have actually been a bit more effective with using social media, local newspapers have overall fallen behind. By engaging the audience and spreading important information, social media has been considered a solid method for strengthening the core standards of journalism. As a result, social media like Twitter has become a vital tool for news agencies to incorporate into their everyday practices.

As a result of the transition to digital content, local news agencies have had to change their business models. Although they previously gained revenue from subscriptions, more agencies have started making money from online advertising, but this only accounts for a small portion of revenue. This loss in revenue has been linked to a decline in local journalistic integrity, because with less profit, the need to make money through clickbait articles has become a necessity.

Influence of Facebook on news stories
In 2018, Tech Crunch journalist Josh Constine reported that Facebook "stole the news business" by using its sponsorship of new outlets to make many news publishers its "ghostwriters." Constine further noted that Facebook has been targeting local news sources for many years. In January 2019, Facebook founder Mark Zuckerberg announced that he will spend $300 million investing in local news over a three-year period.

See also
 Broadcast journalism
 Citizen journalism
 Open-source journalism
 Social media

References

News
Television terminology
Broadcast journalism
Hyperlocal media
Local community news